Pascal (real name – Pavel Petrovich Titov, ; born 17 August 1964, Bryn, Duminichsky District, Kaluga Oblast, RSFSR, USSR) is a Soviet and Russian pop singer, musician and composer.

Together with the poet Konstantin Arsenev wrote a number of songs for Grigory Leps. He participated in the creation of the album "Pure works", dedicated to the 50th anniversary of Igor Talkov.

Biography 
A first education – architect (special secondary – Kaluga municipal Civil Engineering).

For music education entered the Musical College named after Mussorgsky, but after the first year enrolled in the second year of Gnessin State Musical College, the vocal department.

Since the fifth grade, Titov played in amateur teen ensembles: first as a drummer, then – as a guitarist.

Songs began writing while serving in the army. In the mid-80s, Pavel went to Leningrad, where he became a singer and author of the rock band word "We", who played in rock-laboratory groups Alisa, AVIA, Boris Grebenshchikov and other musical authorities.

Since 1998 began to act under the pseudonym Pascal. According to the singer, this nickname is derived from the school nicknames given Titov dislike for the exact sciences. The songs  Silk Heart  and  100% love  on poems by Konstantin Arsenev became a hit on many radio stations.

Awards 
 2000, 2002 – Pesnya goda
 2004 – Best of the Best (Best singer of the year)

References

External links
Official website
   Автобиография на сайте Московского гастрольно-концертного агентства Vipartist
 Биография Павла Титова на сайте «Азбука шансона»

1964 births
Living people
People from Duminichsky District
Soviet male singers
21st-century Russian singers
Russian composers
Russian male composers
Russian singer-songwriters
Russian songwriters
20th-century Russian male singers
20th-century Russian singers
21st-century Russian male singers